Ian Bruce Deans (25 November 1960 – 16 August 2019) was a New Zealand rugby union player. He played for Canterbury during the 1980s and was a key part of the squad for many years. He played for two seasons for New Zealand. He was selected to be the understudy to half-back David Kirk in the All Black squad for the inaugural Rugby World Cup in 1987 but Frano Botica and his self didn't play a match. His first selection came during an end of seasons tour of Japan. Deans also played cricket for Canterbury Country in the Hawke Cup.

Personal life
Bruce Deans played his club rugby at Glenmark Rugby Club, in North Canterbury alongside his brother Robbie Deans. After retiring from rugby, Deans managed his sheep farm near Cheviot. 

Deans' brother Robbie Deans and great-uncle Bob Deans also played for Canterbury and the All Blacks. Bruce Deans died of cancer on 16 August 2019, aged 58.

References

External links
 
 Bruce Deans at Cricket Archive

1960 births
2019 deaths
New Zealand international rugby union players
Canterbury rugby union players
New Zealand rugby union coaches
New Zealand rugby union players
People educated at Christ's College, Christchurch
Old Belvedere R.F.C. players
Expatriate rugby union players in Ireland
People from Cheviot, New Zealand
Rugby union scrum-halves
Deaths from cancer in New Zealand
Bruce
Harper family